The discography of Nick Drake, an English folk musician and singer-songwriter, consists of three studio albums, five singles, seven compilation albums, two box sets, one video album and various soundtrack and compilation appearances.

Drake was born on 19 June 1948 in Yangon, Burma, returning with his family to England in 1950. He was encouraged by his mother to learn piano and later learned clarinet and saxophone while attending Marlborough College. In 1965, Drake purchased his first guitar and began experimenting with open tunings and fingerpicking, techniques that later became a signature in his music. While Drake was attending the University of Cambridge in 1968, he was introduced to the American record producer Joe Boyd and signed a contract to Island Records.

Drake released his debut studio album, Five Leaves Left, in July 1969. The recording sessions and post-production of the album were difficult due to creative differences between Drake and production personnel. Five Leaves Left also received poor marketing from Island and mixed reviews from critics. In March 1971, Drake released his second studio album, Bryter Layter, which featured a more up-tempo and jazz influenced sound. Joe Boyd described that the album had "more of a pop sound" and "imagined it as more commercial". The album sold fewer than 3,000 copies upon its release and received mixed reviews.

Drake suffered from depression following the commercial failure of his first two releases. However, in October 1971 Drake began recording sessions with a new producer, John Wood. Recorded at two midnight sessions at Sound Techniques in London, the sessions resulted in Drake's third and final studio album, Pink Moon. It was released in February 1972 and despite poor sales, received positive critical acclaim. Drake attempted to record a fourth studio album in early 1974, just months prior to his death on 25 November.

Drake failed to reach a wide audience during his lifetime but has since gained wider recognition. Compilations of his music have charted worldwide—including the United Kingdom, Belgium, Ireland and the United States—and rereleases of his singles have entered into the UK Singles Chart. All three of Drake's studio albums, and the compilation album Way to Blue: An Introduction to Nick Drake, have been certified gold by the British Phonographic Industry.

Albums

Studio albums

Compilation albums

Live albums

Box sets

Singles

Retail singles

Promotional singles

Video albums

Compilation appearances

Soundtrack appearances

Notes

References

Bibliography

External links
 
 

Drake, Nick
Drake, Nick
Drake, Nick
Discography